Symphyletes nodosus is a species of beetle in the family Cerambycidae, and the only species in the genus Symphyletes. It was described by Newman in 1842.

References

Pteropliini
Beetles described in 1842